The 2016–17 Perth Scorchers WBBL season was the second in the team's history. Coached by Lisa Keightley and captained by Suzie Bates, the team competed in the WBBL02 competition.

At the conclusion of the group stage, the Scorchers team was second on the table.  The Scorchers then defeated the Brisbane Heat in a semi-final, but lost to the Sydney Sixers in the final, to emerge as the WBBL|02 runners-up.

Squad
The following is the Scorchers women squad for WBBL|02.  Players with international caps are listed in bold.

Sources

Ladder

Fixtures

Group stage

Knockout phase

Semi-final

Final

References

2016–17 Women's Big Bash League season by team
Perth Scorchers (WBBL)